Gina Marie Grosso is an American defense official and retired United States Air Force lieutenant general who is the Assistant Secretary of Veteran Affairs for Human Resources and Administration/Operations, Security and Preparedness since June 23, 2021. In the Air Force, Grosso last served as the Deputy Chief of Staff for Manpower, Personnel and Services (A1), Headquarters U.S. Air Force from October 2015 to October 2018.

General Grosso entered the Air Force in 1986 as a Reserve Officer Training Corps distinguished graduate from Carnegie-Mellon University, Pittsburgh, Pennsylvania. She held several command and staff positions throughout her career. As a staff officer, she served as an operations analyst, personnel programs analyst, Air Staff and Office of the Secretary of Defense action officer, Major Command Director of Manpower and Personnel, Director of the Air Force Colonel Management Office, Director, Manpower, Organization and Resources, and Director of Force Management Policy. Her command tours include a Headquarters Squadron Section, Military Personnel Flight, Mission Support Squadron, command of the Air Force's sole Basic Military Training Group, and as Joint Base and 87th Air Base Wing commander at Joint Base McGuire-Dix-Lakehurst, NJ. Prior to her current assignment, she was the Director of the Air Force Sexual Assault Prevention and Response (SAPR), Office of the Vice Chief of Staff, Headquarters U.S. Air Force, Washington, D.C. 

Gen. Grosso is the first female personnel chief in Air Force history.    She is married to Col. (USAF, Ret) Brian O'Connor, a former C-17 Globemaster III pilot.

Education and training

 1982 Annandale High School, Annandale, Va.
 1986 Bachelor of Science, Applied Mathematics and Industrial Management, Carnegie-Mellon University, Pittsburgh, Pa.
 1992 Master’s degree in business administration, College of William and Mary, Williamsburg, Va.
 1993 Squadron Officer School, Maxwell AFB, Ala.
 1997 Air Command and Staff College, Seminar
 1999 Master’s degree in national security and strategic studies, Naval Command and Staff College, Newport, R.I.
 2000 Air War College, Seminar
 2004 Fellow, Weatherhead Center for International Affairs, Harvard University, Boston, Mass.

Military assignments

 October 1986 - October 1988, Operations Analyst, followed by Commander, Headquarters Squadron Section, 554th Range Group, Nellis AFB, Nev.
 November 1988 - April 1992, Personnel Programs and Force Programs Analyst, Deputy Chief of Staff, Personnel, Headquarters Tactical Air Command, Langley AFB, Va.
 May 1992 - May 1993, Executive Officer, Directorate of Personnel, Headquarters Air Combat Command, Langley AFB, Va.
 May 1993 - July 1993, Student, Squadron Officer School, Maxwell AFB, Ala.
 August 1993 - May 1995, Commander, Military Personnel Flight, 6th Mission Support Squadron, MacDill AFB, Fla.
 June 1995 - January 1997, Chief, Personnel Policy, followed by Deputy Chief, Support Division, Air Force Colonel Matters Office, Pentagon, Washington D.C.
 January 1997 - July 1998, Member, Chief of Staff of the Air Force Operations Group, Headquarters Air Force, Pentagon, Washington D.C.
 July 1998 - July 1999, Student, Naval Command and Staff College, Newport, R.I.
 July 1999 - July 2001, Commander, 51st Mission Support Squadron, Osan Air Base, South Korea
 July 2001 - May 2002, Assistant Director, Enlisted Plans and Policy, Office of the Secretary of Defense, the Pentagon, Washington D.C.
 May 2002 - July 2003, Military Assistant, Deputy Under Secretary of Defense for Military Personnel Policy, Pentagon, Washington D.C.
 July 2003 - July 2004, Fellow, Weatherhead Center for International Affairs, Harvard University, Boston, Mass.
 July 2004 - July 2006, Commander, 737th Training Group, 37th Training Wing, Lackland AFB, Texas
 July 2006 - July 2007, Director, Manpower and Personnel, Headquarters Pacific Air Forces, Hickam AFB, Hawaii
 July 2007 - March 2009, Director, Air Force Colonels Management Office, the Pentagon, Washington D.C.
 March 2009 - June 2011, Commander, Joint Base and 87th Air Base Wing, Joint Base McGuire-Dix-Lakehurst, N.J.
 June 2011 - August 2012, Director, Manpower, Organization and Resources, the Pentagon, Washington D.C.
 August 2012 - January 2014, Director, Force Management Policy, the Pentagon, Washington D.C.
 February 2014 - October 2015, Director, Air Force Sexual Assault Prevention and Response Office, Office of the Vice Chief of Staff, Headquarters U.S. Air Force, Washington, D.C.
 October 2015 - September 2018, Deputy Chief of Staff, Manpower, Personnel and Services, Headquarters U.S. Air Force, Washington D.C.

Awards and decorations
Her major awards and decorations include:

Promotion history
 Second Lieutenant Oct. 2, 1986
 First Lieutenant July 17, 1988
 Captain July 17, 1990
 Major Aug. 1, 1996
 Lieutenant Colonel July 1, 1999
 Colonel Aug. 1, 2003
 Brigadier General April 1, 2011
 Major General July 24, 2014
 Lieutenant General Oct. 15, 2015

References

 

Year of birth missing (living people)
Living people
People from Annandale, Virginia
Carnegie Mellon University alumni
College of William & Mary alumni
College of Naval Command and Staff alumni
Harvard University alumni
Recipients of the Legion of Merit
Female generals of the United States Air Force
Recipients of the Defense Superior Service Medal
Annandale High School alumni
United States Department of Veterans Affairs officials
Biden administration personnel